Chilewadi dam, is an earthfill dam on Mandvi river near Junnar, Pune district in the state of Maharashtra in India.

Specifications

Purpose
 Irrigation

See also
 Dams in Maharashtra
 List of reservoirs and dams in India

References

Dams in Pune district
Dams completed in 2000
2000 establishments in Maharashtra